The 2004 Asian Men's Handball Championship was the eleventh Asian Championship and was held in Doha, Qatar from 12 to 21 February 2004.

Draw

Preliminary round
All times are local (UTC+3).

Group A

Group B

Placement 5th–8th

7th/8th

5th/6th

Final round

Semifinals

Bronze medal match

Gold medal match

Final standing

External links
 
 
 

Asian
Handball
Handball
Asian Handball Championships
February 2004 sports events in Asia